Jagtar Singh Grewal (1927 – 11 August 2022) was an Indian writer, historian, scholar, and a vice-chancellor of the Guru Nanak Dev University (GNDU). After securing his Ph.D. and DLitt from London, he joined the GNDU, where he founded the Department of History. He was the first Dean of the Academic Affairs of the University and was a former member of faculty at the Panjab University, Chandigarh. After his superannuation from GNDU in 1984, he joined the Indian Institute of Advanced Study as its director.

Grewal was a member of the Religious Advisory Council of the Tony Blair Faith Foundation and the head of the Institute of Punjab Studies, Chandigarh. He had published several articles and books on Sikh history and is considered by many as a scholar on the subject. Contesting Interpretations of the Sikh Tradition, The Sikhs of the Punjab, Sikh Ideology, Polity and Social Order, Social and Cultural History of the Punjab, Maharja Ranjit Singh: Polity, Economy and Society, Kinship and State Formation, The Sikhs: Ideology, Institutions, and Identity, Guru Nanak in History and Historical Writings on the Sikhs (1784–2011) are some of his notable works and his researches have been subjected to studies on academic level. The Government of India awarded him the fourth highest civilian honour of the Padma Shri, in 2005, for his contributions to Indian literature.

Bibliography

See also 

 Guru Nanak Dev University
 Tony Blair Faith Foundation

References

Further reading

External links 
 

1927 births
2022 deaths
Recipients of the Padma Shri in literature & education
Indian male writers
20th-century Indian historians
Sikh writers
Scholars of Sikhism
Scholars from Punjab, India
Heads of universities and colleges in India
Guru Nanak Dev University
People from Faisalabad